The Commonwealth and Protectorate (1649-1660) refers to the kingless governments of England (including Wales and Cornwall), Scotland, Great Britain and Ireland during the Interregnum between the actual reigns of the Stuart King Charles I (1625-1649) and his son King Charles II (1660-1685).

See 
 Commonwealth of England (under parliamentary rule, 1649-1653 and 1659-1660)
and
 The Protectorate (The Commonwealth of England, Scotland and Ireland, 1653-1659), under the Lords Protectors, first Oliver Cromwell (1653-1658) and then his son Richard Cromwell (1658-1659)

See also

England
 Kingdom of England
 English Civil War
Cornwall in the English Civil War
 Restoration (England)

Great Britain, Ireland and the colonies
 Wars of the Three Kingdoms
 Battle of the Severn (Maryland, 1655)
 Restoration (1660)

Scotland
 Scotland in the Early Modern Era
 Scotland in the Wars of the Three Kingdoms
 Scotland under the Commonwealth
 Restoration (Scotland)

Ireland
 Kingdom of Ireland
 Confederate Ireland
 Irish Confederate Wars
 Cromwellian conquest of Ireland
 Restoration (Ireland)

External links
 United Kingdom: Flags (and arms) of the Interregnum, 1649-1660, Flags of the World web site, retrieved 13 May 2013

Interregnum (England)